LKL Kursis (M54) is a minehunter of the Lithuanian Naval Force. Germany donated Marburg in 2001 to the Lithuanian Naval Force, which renamed the ship Kursis. The vessel augmented the Squadron of Mine-hunters, which had been established in 1999 with the similar donation of sister ship Koblenz, which became .

References 
 
 

Ships built in Bremen (state)
1958 ships
Cold War minesweepers of Germany
Lindau-class minesweepers of the Lithuanian Naval Force
Minehunters of Lithuania